Sironko is the largest metropolitan area in Sironko District of the Eastern Region of Uganda and the site of the district headquarters.

Location
The coordinates of the town are 01°13'50.0"N, 34°14'53.0"E (Latitude:1.230556; Longitude:34.248056).

Overview
Sironko is the location of the headquarters of Sironko District, one of the six Ugandan districts in the Bugisu sub-region. The town is administered by Sironko Town Council, headed by a mayor. It is one of the only two town councils in the district, as of June 2020. The other town in the district is Budadiri Town.

Sironko town lies at the foothills of Mount Elgon. The area is prone to landslides and flooding. On more than one occasion, landslides have killed people and caused damage and loss of property in the area of Sironko town and in other parts of Sironko District.

Population
The 1991 national census put the population of the town at 3,180 people. The national census of 2002 enumerated the population of Sironko town at 11,193 people. In 2014, the national census and household population survey enumerated the town's population at 17,103 people. In 2019, the Uganda Bureau of Statistics (UBOS), estimated the mid-year population of the town at approximately 18,900 inhabitants. The table below gives the same data in tabular form.

See also
 Bugisu sub-region
 Eastern Region
 List of cities and towns in Uganda

References

External links
Sironko District Profile at Ugandatravelguide.com
Sironko District Hazard, Risk and Vulnerability Profile As of 2016.

Populated places in Eastern Region, Uganda
Sironko District
Bugisu sub-region